Giulia Gasparri (born 31 October 1991, Ravenna, Italy) is an Italian former professional tennis player. and currently a professional Beach tennis player. She currently ranks number 1 on ITF Beach Tennis World Tour Ranking, sharing the position with her partner Ninny Valentini. Lives in Ravenna

Tennis career
She has won two singles and doubles titles on the ITF Women's Circuit. On 7 June 2010, she reached her best singles ranking of world No. 608. On 18 October, she peaked at No. 634 in the doubles rankings. Gasparri retired from professional tennis in 2013 and decided to follow the beach tennis.

Beach Tennis career
Since 2014 she is a professional beach tennis player. On 19 September 2016, she reached her best ranking world No. 1 ranking. In 2017 and 2018 Giulia Gasparri and Federica Bacchetta defended their ITF Beach Tennis World Championships  for a second straight year in Cervia.

In 2017 October Gasparri partnering Federica Bacchetta. They won the 2017 European Beach Tennis Championships in the final over Flaminia Daina and Sofia Cimatti 6–4 4–6 7–6 in Sozopol.

In 2019 September Gasparri partnering Sofia Cimatti. They won the 2019 European Beach Tennis Championships in the final over Flaminia Daina and Nicole Nobile 6–3 2–6 6–1 in Sozopol.

In 2021 started playing with Ninny Valentini and won six titles including ITF World Champions in Terracina

In 2022 Gasparri won five titles, all with Ninny Valentini

She has 42 ITF titles

References

External links
 
 

1991 births
Living people
Italian female tennis players
Female tennis players playing beach tennis